Brigadier Muhammad Aslam Khan (1918–1994) was a Pakistani military officer, who led the Gilgit Scouts and Azad rebels in the First Kashmir War. Using the nom de guerre of 'Colonel Pasha', he organised a force of 1200 rebels and local recruits in Gilgit, and led an attack on the Indian Army and the State Forces from the north, conquering Skardu and Kargil and advancing within 30 miles of Leh. Even though the Indian Army eventually repulsed the attack beyond Kargil, Skardu remained part of the rebel territory, coming under Pakistani control at the end of the war.

Early life 
Aslam Khan was born in Jammu on 27 August 1918 into an Afridi family. His father, Brigadier Rehmatullah Khan of the Jammu and Kashmir State Forces, was instrumental in bringing Gilgit, Hunza and Skardu under the control of the Jammu and Kashmir State.

Aslam Khan was one of eight siblings, included among whom was Air Chief Marshal Asghar Khan, who later served as the Chief of the Pakistan Air Force.

Jammu and Kashmir State Forces 
Aslam Khan was commissioned into the Jammu and Kashmir State Forces in 1939. He was part of the 4th Jammu and Kashmir Infantry battalion (also called the "Fateh Shibji" battalion) He was posted at Rattu in the Gilgit Wazarat for two years.

With the outbreak of the World War II, the 4th Jammu and Kashmir Infantry, was sent to Burma to fight the Japanese as part of the British Imperial Forces. Aslam Khan distinguished himself in the attack on the Kennedy Peak and was awarded a Military Cross. The victory celebrations were held jointly with the First Punjabis of the British Indian Army, and Aslam Khan danced with Major Daler Singh Bajwa of the State Forces and Major Gul Rehman of First Punjabis. The camaraderie between the men of all religions was taken for granted in 1945.

After returning from the war, Aslam Khan was posted to Jammu with the rank of a Major. Captain Mirza Hassan Khan at Bhimber, another winner of Military Cross, mentions the formation of a 'revolutionary council' among the army officers, of which he was the chairman. Its members planned to overthrow the Maharaja's government after the departure of the British by attacking the local garrisons. Major Aslam Khan was said to have been part of the group, meant to take charge in Jammu.

Soon afterwards, Aslam Khan decided to move to the British Indian Army. He was posted to Ranchi as  G-II. During the Partition, he opted for Pakistan.

Pakistan army and Azad Kashmir

Tribal invasion of Kashmir 

While in the Pakistan Army, Aslam Khan is said to have gone on leave around 21 October 1947. On his way to Srinagar, at Lohar Gali, he ran into the Pashtun tribal invasion being led by Khurshid Anwar. He decided to join the invasion force and became the second-in-command. Aslam Khan described himself as a deserter of the Pakistani Army to a reporter. Scholar Andrew Whitehead remarks, "this is unlikely to be the full story", and Indian sources allege that such army officers were seconded to the invasion force by the Pakistan Army.

Following the accession of Jammu and Kashmir to India, Indian troops were airlifted on 27 October to repel the invasion. The 1st Sikh regiment of the Indian Army, under the command of Lt. Col. Dewan Ranjit Rai, proceeded to Baramula immediately upon landing. Aslam Khan's "accurate handling of captured mortars" broke their first stand. Col. Ranjit Rai was killed. The 1st Sikhs withdrew to Patan where they set up a defensive position. As more troops were flown in each day, the Indians renewed their attack and beat back the invading tribes beyond Uri by 7 November. The Kashmir Valley was secured.

Gilgit and Baltistan 
In the Gilgit Agency at the north of Jammu and Kashmir, the Gilgit Scouts under the command of Major William Brown rebelled on 1 November 1947 and imprisoned the State's governor Brigadier Ghansara Singh. The Muslim troops of the Bunji garrison under the command of Mirza Hassan Khan joined them, and the non-Muslims were eliminated. On 16 November, Pakistan sent a Political Agent Khan Mohammad Alam Khan to take control, bringing Gilgit under the effective control of Pakistan.

On 10 January 1948, Aslam Khan arrived in Gilgit to take command of the Gilgit Scouts. He presented the credentials the Azad Kashmir government. Writer F. M. Khan states:

The British High Commission in India immediately connected the name Aslam Khan with the erstwhile second-in-command of the tribal invasion.

Aslam Khan, apparently promoted to the rank of Lt. Col, used the nom de guerre 'Colonel Pasha', which kept his identity somewhat clouded. On 31 November he assembled all the officers of the 'Azad forces' (the Gilgit Scouts, the rebels from the Bunji garrison and other local recruits), and pointed out that their primary task was to capture and consolidate Skardu in Baltistan (part of the Ladakh Wazarat). He asked for volunteers to lead the expedition, but none came forward. He then divided the available forces into three groups:
 Ibex Force, consisting of 400 men under the command of Major Ehsan Khan, from the 6th Jammu and Kashmir Infantry. It was tasked with capturing Skardu. It was supposed to "hop, like an ibex of this area".
 Tiger Force, consisting of 400 men under the command of Captain Mirza Hassan Khan, also from the 6th Jammu and Kashmir Infantry. It was tasked with attacking Gurais via Bunji and Kamri, and advance to Bandipora, with the "growling noise of a tiger".
 Eskimo Force, a force of equal strength under Lieutenant Shah Khan of Gilgit Scouts. It was tasked with advancing through the Deosai Plateau and attack Drass, Kargil and the Zojila Pass.

Scholar Ahmad Hasan Dani states:

With the Zojila Pass cut off, India's link with Leh would be severed and the entire Ladakh Wazarat fall into the rebels' hands. These results were substantially achieved by 19 May 1948. India was able to save Leh only by raising a local militia, Ladakh Scouts, and constructing an emergency airstrip for receiving armaments.

Return to Pakistan 
At this stage, Aslam Khan sent a wireless message to his commander in Rawalpindi. General Douglas Gracey, the Commander-in-Chief, was "bewildered" and ordered him to report back at his office. Once returned, he was appointed as the private secretary to General Gracey, away from the land of adventure.

Meanwhile, his father Brigadier Rehmatullah Khan was in prison in Kashmir, regarded as an "enemy agent". He was repatriated to Pakistan on 2 December 1948, as part of a prisoner exchange. Major Daler Singh Bajwa, Aslam Khan's dancing partner in the 1945 victory celebrations, gave him a send off. The property of Rehmatullah Khan was seized by the State as evacuee property. The family's two cars were later used by Sheikh Abdullah and D. P. Dhar.

Aslam Khan was promoted to the one-star rank of Brigadier at an age of 36. He was not promoted further, and retired in 1963.

His younger brother Asghar Khan rose to be the Commander-in-Chief of the Pakistan Air Force, retiring in 1965.

Shangrila Resort 

After retirement, Aslam Khan eschewed "politics", and worked for the development of tourism in the trans-Himalayan region of Baltistan. He founded Shangrila Resort in Skardu, taking inspiration from James Hilton's novel Lost Horizon. It is now a top tourist destination in Pakistan, and is currently managed by his son Arif Aslam Khan.

Death 

Muhammad Aslam Khan died of natural causes in 1994.

Notes

References

Bibliography

External links
 Shangri La James Hilton Novel to Resort in Skardu, Skardu.pk, retrieved 18 April 2018.

1918 births
1994 deaths
People from Jammu and Kashmir
British Indian Army officers
Pashtun people
Indian people of World War II
Pakistan Army officers
People of the Indo-Pakistani War of 1947
Jammu and Kashmir State Forces